Olifant, Oliphant, Olyphant and similar variations may refer to:

Geography
Oliphant, Ontario, Canada, a community
Oliphant Islands, South Orkney Islands
Olifants River (Limpopo), South Africa
Olifants River (Southern Cape), South Africa
Olifants River (Western Cape), South Africa
Olifants Water Management Area, South Africa
Olyphant, Pennsylvania, a borough

People
Oliphant (surname), a list of notable people with this name
Oliphant Chuckerbutty (1884–1960), British organist and composer
Clan Oliphant, a Highland Scottish clan

Arts, entertainment, and media
Oliphant (band), a Finnish band
Oliphant, a type of monster in the Index of Advanced Dungeons & Dragons 1st edition monsters
Oliphaunt or mûmak, a monstrous elephant-like creature in J. R. R. Tolkien's The Lord of the Rings
Sir Olifaunt, a vicious giant in Geoffrey Chaucer's "Tale of Sir Thopas", in The Canterbury Tales
Eleanor Oliphant, protagonist of Gail Honeyman's Eleanor Oliphant is Completely Fine

Titles
Lord Oliphant, a peerage title in Scotland
Oliphant baronets, a title in the Baronetage of Nova Scotia

Vehicles
 Olifant tank, a South African version of the British  Centurion tank

Others
Oliphant v. Suquamish Indian Tribe, a U.S. Supreme Court case deciding that Indian tribal courts have no criminal jurisdiction over non-Indians
Olifant (instrument), a wind instrument of the Middle Ages, made from elephants' tusks
D'Oliphant, a Dutch mansion originally built near Nieuwesluis, later moved to Rotterdam
De Olifant, Burdaard, a windmill in the Netherlands

See also 
 Elefant (disambiguation)
 Elephant (disambiguation)